Anelaphus piceus is a species of beetle in the family Cerambycidae. It was described by Chemsak in 1962.

References

Anelaphus
Beetles described in 1962